The first official Lebanese Chess Championship was held in 1953.  Lebanese chess players had organized a tournament in 1943 to determine an unofficial champion, won by  Charles Salameh.  In 1953 Salameh also won the first official championship tournament.  The championship has been held regularly, except in the war years of 1969, 1973, and 1975 to 1991.  Edgard Chalabi's death caused the 1963 championship to be skipped, and no championship was held in 2006.  The women's championship began in 1994.

Men and women play together in a single tournament.
The top scorer wins the men's (overall) championship, the top female scorer wins the women's championship.
In 2005, 22-year-old WIM Knarik Mouradian became the first woman to win the men's championship, winning eight games, drawing three, and losing none (9.5/11).  FM Ahmad Najjar finished second.  In 2007 they exchanged places, with Najjar winning the men's championship with 8.0/9 and Mouradian in second place a half point behind with 7.5/9 to win the women's championship.

in January 2019, Antoine Emile Kassis was named winner of the Lebanese Chess Championship after showing a steady and impeccable performance.

Results
{|- class="sortable wikitable"
|-! Year !! Men's Champion !! Women's Champion
| 1953 ||  || –
|-
| 1955 ||  || –
|-
| 1956 || Edgard Chalabi || –
|-
| 1957 ||  || –
|-
| 1958 || Edgard Chalabi || –
|-
| 1959 ||  || –
|-
| 1960 ||  || –
|-
| 1961 ||  || –
|-
| 1962 ||  || –
|-
| 1964 ||  || –
|-
| 1965 ||  || –
|-
| 1966 ||  || –
|-
| 1967 ||  || –
|-
| 1968 ||  || –
|-
| 1970 ||  || –
|-
| 1971 ||  || –
|-
| 1972 ||  || –
|-
| 1974 ||  || –
|-
| 1992 ||  || –
|-
| 1993 ||  || –
|Wissam Hajj Ali
| 1994 ||                    || 
|-
| 1995 ||        || 
|-
| 1996 ||            || 
|-
| 1997 ||         || 
|-
| 1998 ||                    || 
|-
| 1999 ||            || 
|-
| 2000 ||  || 
|-
| 2001 ||            ||
|-
| 2002 ||||
|-
| 2003 ||||
|-
| 2004 ||||
|-
| 2005 ||||
|-
| 2007 ||            || 
|-
| 2008 ||||
|-
| 2009 ||                    || 
|-
| 2010 ||        || 
|-
| 2011 || || 
|-
| 2012 ||  || 
|-
| 2013 ||  || 
|-
| 2014 ||  || 
|-
| 2015 ||  || 
|-
| 2016 ||  || 
|-
| 2018 || ||
|-
| 2019 || ||
|}

References

Chess national championships
Women's chess national championships
Chess in Lebanon
1953 in chess
1994 in chess
Recurring sporting events established in 1953
Chess
Women's chess
Chess